New! is a British weekly magazine, specialising in celebrity news and is published by Reach plc, which also oversees OK! magazine, the Daily Mirror, Daily Express and Daily Star.

Profile
New! was first published in March 2003. The slogan runs, "if it's hot, it's here". 

It features columnists Peter Andre and  Kerry Katona. A new issue is published every Tuesday.

References

External links
Official Website
MaxoMag Website
Celebrity & Actress Bio

Northern & Shell
Magazines established in 2003
News magazines published in the United Kingdom
Weekly magazines published in the United Kingdom
Celebrity magazines published in the United Kingdom
Entertainment magazines published in the United Kingdom
2003 establishments in the United Kingdom